Vernon Downing (1913–1973) was a British actor who appeared in many Hollywood films, generally playing English characters.

Filmography

References

External links

1913 births
1973 deaths
English male film actors
Male actors from Suffolk
20th-century English male actors
British expatriate male actors in the United States